The Costa Rican brushfinch or grey-striped brushfinch (Arremon costaricensis) is a species of bird in the family Passerellidae.

Taxonomy
The Costa Rican brushfinch is often treated as a subspecies of the stripe-headed brushfinch (A. torquatus), but was determined a distinct species, together with the black-headed brushfinch, on the basis of differences in vocalization, plumage, and genetics.

References

Arremon
Birds of Central America
Birds of Costa Rica
Birds of Panama
Birds described in 1907
Taxa named by Outram Bangs